Cyclin-dependent kinases regulatory subunit 2 is a protein that in humans is encoded by the CKS2 gene.

CKS2 protein binds to the catalytic subunit of the cyclin dependent kinases and is essential for their biological function. The CKS2 mRNA is found to be expressed in different patterns through the cell cycle in HeLa cells, which reflects specialized role for the encoded protein.

References

External links

Further reading

Cell cycle regulators